John Schnierle (1808–1861) was the thirty-fourth mayor of Charleston, South Carolina, serving from 1842 to 1846. He was sworn into another term as mayor of Charleston on September 6, 1843. While mayor, he lived at 31 Pitt Street. He died on April 14, 1861, and is buried at Magnolia Cemetery. In September 1851, he defeated T. Leger Hutchinson by a vote of 1,334 to 1,282.

References

1808 births
1861 deaths
Mayors of Charleston, South Carolina
19th-century American politicians